TVM might be an acronym or abbreviation for:
Television movie
The 1996 Doctor Who television movie, as it is sometimes referred to by fans
Threat and Vulnerability Management
Ticket vending machine
Time value of money - Finance and Accounting
Time-Varying Microscale, a diagnostic model for high-resolution mapping
Track-via-missile, a missile guidance technique
Transmission voie-machine, a train control system in use on TGV lines in France, Belgium, KTX lines in South Korea and HS1 in the United Kingdom.
Television Malta, one of the national public television stations in Malta
Television Maldives, a television station in the Maldives
Televisão de Moçambique, the state broadcaster of Mozambique
TVM (insurance), a Dutch insurance company
TVM (cycling team), a Dutch cycling team
TVM, an end to end machine learning compiler framework for CPUs, GPUs and accelerators
TVM a fictional music channel in Degrassi
Taiwan Video and Monitor Corporation, a former Taiwanese computer monitor company
International Business School of Vilnius University in Lithuania
Trans-Val-de-Marne, a bus rapid transit line in the Val-de-Marne department in France, operated by RATP Group; see List of RER stations
TV-M, the highest ratings classification in the American TV Parental Guidelines
The Vagina Monologues, a play by Eve Ensler
Transaction Verification Model
Thiruvananthapuram (also Trivandrum), capital city of Kerala state of India
Tiruvannamalai, a major city in state of Tamil Nadu, India

See also
TVM3, a private television station in Switzerland